Rikki Wemega-Kwawu is a contemporary Ghanaian artist, born on February 3, 1959, in the city of Sekondi, Ghana.  A painter since 1981, he is largely self-taught, though he is an alumnus of Skowhegan School of Painting and Sculpture in Skowhegan, Maine.  He has participated in many group exhibitions and his work can be found across the world in private and public collections, including the Dutch Artotheek.

Wemega-Kwawu is, in his own words, "a very eclectic painter, swinging easily between pictorial and abstract themes, without any qualms."  A statement written by the artist can be found at the website of African Encounters, his representatives on the west coast.

Wemega-Kwawu's work is characterized by a synthesis of the past and the present.  He incorporates a plethora of ancient African symbols into his large-scale paintings. He states: "Drawing upon a vein of ancient African religious iconography, I aim in my work at a symbolic expression of a spiritual process and spiritual knowledge to recapture the lost power of traditional African art."

He is also known as a "conceptual artist" and promotes the use of diverse media in visual art. His projects include those that address the effects of globalization and the African diaspora on African art.

His painting Ashanti Saga was included in the exhibition "Artists Speak" at the San Diego Museum of Man, on display from May 2007 through February 28, 2008.

Wemega-Kwawu also writes about the politics of cultural dictatorship in the evaluation of modern African art.

References

External links
African Encounters  Rikki Wemega-Kwawu's west coast representatives
Gallery of selected Rikki Wemega-Kwawu artwork
Artist's Statement by Rikki Wemega-Kwawu

1959 births
Living people
20th-century Ghanaian painters
20th-century male artists
Male painters
Ghanaian male artists
21st-century Ghanaian painters
21st-century male artists
Skowhegan School of Painting and Sculpture alumni